Lord Davies may refer to:

 David Davies, 1st Baron Davies (1880–1944), of Llandinam
 David Davies, 3rd Baron Davies (born 1940), of Llandinam
 Mervyn Davies, Baron Davies of Abersoch (born 1952), British former banker and was a Labour government minister
 Bryn Davies, Baron Davies of Brixton (born 1944), British trade unionist, actuary and politician
 Garfield Davies, Baron Davies of Coity (1935–2019), peer in the House of Lords and a former trade union leader
 Byron Davies, Baron Davies of Gower (born 1952), British politician
 Harold Davies, Baron Davies of Leek (1904–1985)
 Bryan Davies, Baron Davies of Oldham (born 1939), Labour member of the House of Lords
 Elfed Davies, Baron Davies of Penrhys (1913–1992), Labour member
 Quentin Davies, Baron Davies of Stamford

Lord Davies may also refer to:
 Stanley Clinton-Davis, Baron Clinton-Davis (born 1928)
 Edmund Davies, Baron Edmund-Davies (1906–1992), British judge
 Richard Llewelyn-Davies, Baron Llewelyn-Davies (1912–1981), British architect

See also 
 Lord Harding-Davies, the peerage title chosen by John Davies